Events in the year 1978 in Germany.

Incumbents
President – Walter Scheel 
Chancellor – Helmut Schmidt

Events
20 February - Germany in the Eurovision Song Contest 1978
22 February - March 5 - 28th Berlin International Film Festival
16/17 July - 4th G7 summit in Bonn
25 July - Celle Hole
 undated: Die Tageszeitung is first published.

Catastrophes 
13 December - the motor ship MS München sank.

Births 
January 18 - Katja Kipping, German politician
January 18 - Stev Theloke, German swimmer
January 21 - Sven Schmid, German fencer
February 1 - Tobias Hans, German politician
February 18 - Oliver Pocher, German television presenter
February 20 - Julia Jentsch, German actress
February 26 - Tom Beck, German actor
March 6 - Thomas Godoj, Polish-born German singer and winner of Deutschland sucht den Superstar (season 5)
March 16 - Annett Renneberg, German actress
April 5 - Franziska van Almsick, German swimmer
April 27 - Pinar Atalay, German  radio and television presenter
May 3 - Franziska Giffey, German politician
May 20 - Nils Schumann, German athlete
May 21 
 Briana Banks, German-American porn star
 Katharina Wagner, German opera director
June 9 - Miroslav Klose, German football player
June 16 - Daniel Brühl, German actor
June 19 - Dirk Nowitzki, German basketball player
July 9 - Mark Medlock, German singer and winner of Deutschland sucht den Superstar (season 4)
July 20 - Ludwig Hartmann, German politician
August 10 - Oliver Petszokat, German singer and actor
August 15 - Adel Tawil, German singer-songwriter
August 18 - Daniel Hartwich, German television presenter

Deaths
January 3 - Alfred Braun, German actor and film director (born 1888)
January 14 - Robert Heger, German conductor (born 1886)
February 13 - Willi Domgraf-Fassbaender, German opera singer (born 1897)
March 5 - Adolf Metzner, German athlete (born 1910)
March 14 - Carl Vincent Krogmann, German politician (born 1889)
May 30 - Gotthard Handrick, German athlete and fighter pilot (born 1908)
June 4 - Ernst Langlotz, German archaeologist (born 1895)
July 1 - Kurt Student, German paratroop general in the Luftwaffe during World War II. (born 1890)
July 20  - Gertrud Morgner, German politician (born 1887)
September 6 - Adolf Dassler, founder of the Adidas shoe company (born 1900)
September 15 - Willy Messerschmitt, German aircraft designer and manufacturer  (born 1898)
September 24 - Hasso von Manteuffel, German general during World War II  (born 1897)
September 24 - Ida Noddack, German chemist (born 1896)
December 17 - Josef Frings, German cardinal of Roman Catholic Church (born 1887)

References

 
Years of the 20th century in Germany
1970s in Germany
Germany
Germany